Vrbátky is a municipality and village in Prostějov District in the Olomouc Region of the Czech Republic. It has about 1,700 inhabitants.

Administrative parts
Villages of Dubany and Štětovice are administrative parts of Vrbátky.

Economy
A sugar factory has been in Vrbátky since 1870. It was the first sugar factory in the region of Moravia.

References

Villages in Prostějov District